Phytoecia ferrea is a species of beetle in the family Cerambycidae. It was described by Ganglbauer in 1887, originally as a varietas of the species Phytoecia cylindrica. It is known from Russia, China and Mongolia.

References

Phytoecia
Beetles described in 1887